Marek Solčanský (born 18 November 1992, in Poprad) is a Slovak luger.

Solčanský competed at the 2014 Winter Olympics for Slovakia. In the doubles he competed with Karol Stuchlák, finishing 16th.

As of September 2014, Solčanský's best performance at the FIL World Luge Championships is 20th, in the 2012 Championships.

As of September 2014, Solčanský's best Luge World Cup overall finish is 14th in 2012–13.

References

External links
 

1992 births
Living people
Slovak male lugers
Lugers at the 2014 Winter Olympics
Lugers at the 2018 Winter Olympics
Olympic lugers of Slovakia
Sportspeople from Poprad